What, Now? is the 27th studio album by singer-songwriter Peter Hammill, released on his Fie! label in June 2001. According to the booklet it was "recorded, mixed and mastered at Terra Incognita, Bath between, oh, sometime in the late XXth Century and 11:23 (GMT) March 23rd 2001." It was produced by Peter Hammill.

Track listing
All tracks composed by Peter Hammill.

"Here Come The Talkies" – 9:41
"Far - Flung (across the sky)" – 3:21
"The American Girl" – 3:06
"Wendy & The Lost Boy" – 3:26
"Lunatic in Knots" – 8:04
"Edge of the Road" – 10:03
"Fed to the Wolves" – 6:22
"Enough" – 4:53

Personnel
All instruments and voices by Peter Hammill except:
 Stuart Gordon – violin & viola (1, 3, 5, 7)
 David Jackson – saxophones, flute & whistles (3, 6)
 Manny Elias – drums (1, 5, 6, 7)

Technical
Peter Hammill - recording engineer, mixing (Terra Incognita, Bath)
Paul Ridout - design, photography

Notes

Peter Hammill albums
2001 albums